The California Faculty Association (CFA) is a labor union in California, United States. It represents lecturers, professors, counselors, librarians and coaches from the 23 campuses of the California State University (CSU). It is the exclusive collective bargaining agent for all faculty in the CSU system. In 2017, their annual revenue was $393,660.

Structure and governance 
CFA has a board of directors which is composed of a president, vice-president, secretary, treasurer, associate vice president of northern campuses, associate vice president of southern campuses, council representatives, lecturer representatives, and campus chapter presidents. In addition to the board of directors, CFA contains caucuses, councils, and committees that conduct aspects of CFA work and a student organization, Students for Quality Education.

The caucuses include: African American Caucus, Asian Pacific Islander Caucus, CFA Chicanx/Latinx Caucus , Disability Caucus , Indigenous Peoples Caucus, LGBTQIA+ Caucus, Teacher Education Caucus, and Women's Caucus. There are three councils which include the Council for Racial and Social Justice, the CFA Council for Lecturers, and the CFA Council of Chapter Presidents. As of 2020, the standing committees are: CFA Audit Committee, Bargaining Team, Bylaws and Policy, CFA Coaches' Committee, Contract Development & Bargaining Strategy, Counselors' Committee, CFA Elections Committee, Finance Committee, Health & Retirement Benefits Committee, Librarians' Committee, Membership & Organizing Committee, CFA Peace & Justice Committee, Political Action & Legislation Committee, Representation Committee, and Retired Faculty Committee.

History 
After the State Employer-Employee Relations Act of 1978 was passed in California allowing for union representation of state employees, two unions competed to become the exclusive bargaining agent of the CSU. The Congress of Faculty Associations prevailed in a close 1982 election over the United Professors of California, and then changed their name to the California Faculty Association. Prior to 1986, librarians had a dual-track system with some librarians having faculty status and others classified as staff. All librarians were incorporated as faculty when  newly represented by CFA.

The Women's Caucus was CFA's first caucus, formed in the late 1990s with its first Women's Conference held in 2000. In 2002, the Latina/o and African-American causes were created. The Indigenous Peoples Caucus was formed in 2019. The first equity conference was organized in 2004 and the keynote was delivered by Justice Cruz Reynoso about CA Proposition 209 and its impact on students of color in the CSU.

In 2019, CFA disaffiliated with the California Teacher's Association and the National Education Association.

Composition 
CFA represents all California State University Faculty. As of 2018, the faculty were 56.17% lecturers, 37.9% tenured or tenure-track professors, 1.4% coaches, 1.3% librarians. While all faculty members are represented by CFA, only those who complete their membership applications may vote on CFA business. As of Fall 2015, 61% of all CSU Faculty are registered CFA members.

References

External links
 
 CFA Archival Collections

Service Employees International Union
Trade unions in California
Tertiary education trade unions
Faculty Association, California
State wide trade unions in the United States
Education trade unions